Teuthonista is a phonetic transcription system used predominantly for the transcription of (High) German dialects.  It is very similar to other Central European transcription systems from the early 20th century. The base characters are mostly based on the Latin alphabet, which can be modified by various diacritics.

History
The name Teuthonista goes back to the Journal Teuthonista, in which the transcription system was presented in 1924/25.

Symbols
Most of the characters derive from the Latin or Greek alphabet, and from earlier systems such as Dania. The consonants are primarily mono-phonemic symbols. Fine nuances in articulation can be distinguished by diacritics (e.g. dots or tildes beneath or across the character). Vowels are distinguished with a more extensive system of diacritics. To describe the various dialectal sounds of the German letter "e", for example, the system uses the letter "e" with trémas, upstrokes, tildes and ogoneks, separately and in combination. It is possible to write more than 500 different variants of the letter "e". There are a number of Teuthonista systems that use different base letters and diacritics, and the characters they have in common do not have defined values between systems. 

In Reichel (2003), the basic vowel letters are a e i o u. Vowels are stacked for an intermediate articulation (near-low vowels aͤ and aͦ, high-mid vowels iͤ and oͧ, central vowels uͥ and oͤ). Reduced vowels are ɪ ʊ ə α. 

Lenis and fortis consonants are paired: b p, d t, k g. For fricatives they are:

As in the IPA and extIPA, diacritics may doubled for greater degree and placed in parentheses for a lesser degree. For example, ẹ, ę are a close (high) and open (low) e, while e̤, e᷎᷎ are a closer (higher) and more open (lower) e, and ẹ᪽, ę᪽ are only slightly raised and lowered e. Similarly, ë and ẽ are rounded and nasalized e, while ë̈, ẽ̃ are extra-rounded and extra-nasalized e and ë᪻, ẽ᪻ are slightly rounded and nasalized e. Parentheses around a double diacritic, such as ë̈᪻, mean the degree of modification is intermediate between that indicated by a single and a double diacritic.

Usage
The Teuthonista phonetic transcription system is used by the following projects:

Lexicons
 Badisches Wörterbuch
 Bayerisches Wörterbuch
 Wörterbuch der bairischen Mundarten in Österreich

Linguistic atlases
 Sprachatlas der deutschen Schweiz
 Südwestdeutscher Sprachatlas
 Atlas der historischen deutschen Mundarten auf dem Gebiet der Tschechischen Republik
 Sprachatlas von Oberösterreich
 Vorarlberger Sprachatlas
 Teilprojekte des Bayerischen Sprachatlas
 Sprachatlas von Bayerisch-Schwaben
 Sprachatlas von Mittelfranken
 Sprachatlas von Unterfranken
 Sprachatlas von Niederbayern
 Sprachatlas von Nordostbayern
 Sprachatlas von Oberbayern

See also
Dania transcription
Unicode ranges Latin Extended-E, Combining Diacritical Marks Supplement (overscript consonants), Combining Diacritical Marks Extended

References

Further reading
 Teuchert, Hermann: Lautschrift des Teuthonista. In: Teuthonista. 1 (1924/25), 5. 
 Wiesinger, Peter: Das phonetische Transkriptionssystem der Zeitschrift "Teuthonista". Eine Studie zu seiner Entstehung und Anwendbarkeit in der deutschen Dialektologie mit einem Überblick über die Geschichte der phonetischen Transkription im Deutschen bis 1924. In: ''Zeitschrift für Mundartforschung.' 31. 1964: 1–20.

External links 
  
  

Phonetic alphabets
German phonology
Writing systems introduced in the 1920s
1920s in science